Dawn Tobacco Frank is an American biologist and academic administrator. She is president of the Oglala Lakota College.

Life 
Frank was born to Sylvia Tobacco and Darrell Two Crow. Her Lakota name, Ta Oyate Wiyankapi Win translates to Her People See Her. Frank's maternal grandparents were Stephen “Psin” Tobacco and Caroline Catches Tobacco. Her paternal grandparents were Justin “Judson” Two Crow and Anna “Annie” Chief Eagle-Two Crow. She is a member of the Oglala Sioux and was raised on the Pine Ridge Indian Reservation. Frank completed elementary and secondary education at Red Cloud Indian School, graduating in 1989. While working and raising her kids, she graduated from Oglala Lakota College (OLC) with an associate's and bachelor's degree (2001) in human services. At OLC, she began a master's degree in Lakota leadership before being accepted into a W. K. Kellogg Foundation funded "Prairie Ph.D." program at South Dakota State University (SDSU) where she earned a Ph.D. in biological sciences from South Dakota State University in 2010. Her dissertation was titled, Integrating Lakota culture and biological science into a holistic research methodology (Lakol wico un na wico han wopasi). She later the OLC master's degree in Lakota leadership.

From 2005 to 2013, Frank was head of the OLC graduate studies department. She served as the OLC vice president of instruction from 2013 to 2022. She became the OLC president on July 18, 2022, succeeding Thomas Short Bull.

Frank is married to Albert Frank and has five children. She lives on the Pine Ridge Indian Reservation.

References 

Living people
Year of birth missing (living people)
Oglala people
Women heads of universities and colleges
South Dakota State University alumni
21st-century Native American women
21st-century Native Americans
Lakota leaders
Female Native American leaders
Heads of universities and colleges in the United States
Native American women scientists
21st-century American women scientists
Scientists from South Dakota
American women biologists
People from the Pine Ridge Indian Reservation, South Dakota
Native American women academics